Herman Bavinck (13 December 1854 – 29 July 1921) was a Dutch Calvinist theologian and churchman. He was a significant scholar in the Calvinist tradition, alongside Abraham Kuyper, B. B. Warfield, and Geerhardus Vos.

Biography

Background
Bavinck was born on 13 December 1854 in the town of Hoogeveen in the Netherlands to a German father, Jan Bavinck (1826–1909), who was the minister of theologically conservative, ecclesiastically separatist Christian Reformed Church (Christelijke Gereformeerde Kerk).  After his high school education, Bavinck first went to the Theological School in Kampen in 1873, but then moved on to Leiden for further training after one year in Kampen. He wrote in his student journal notes that he was motivated to transfer his studies by the preaching of the pastor , who was also ministering in Leiden by that time. He studied under prominent faculties such as Johannes Scholten and Abraham Kuenen, and finally graduated in 1880 from the University of Leiden having completed a dissertation on the ethics of Ulrich Zwingli.

A year later, Bavinck was appointed Professor of Dogmatics at Theological School in Kampen. While serving there, he also assisted his denomination that had formed out of the withdrawal of orthodox Calvinists earlier from the state Hervormde Kerk, a withdrawal movement called the "Afscheiding" (Secession) in its merger with a second and subsequent larger breakaway movement that also left the Hervormde Kerk, this time under the leadership of Abraham Kuyper, a movement called the "Doleantie" (the Complaint: a historical reference to the term used by orthodox Reformed ministers who opposed Arminianism prior to the National Synod of Dordt, 1618–19).

The now-united Church combined the "Afgescheidenen" and "Dolerenden" into the Gereformeerde Kerken in Nederland  (GKiN).  As a result of the merger, GKiN inherited the denominational seminary of the Afscheiding churches and that seminary became the denominational seminary of the GKiN, where Bavinck stayed put, so as to ease the transition of his colleagues and people within the much larger new Church.  Already, when the Afgescheidenen merged with the Dolerenden, there was a minority of the Seceders who stayed out of the union; they formed their new denomination as the Christelijke Gereformeerde Kerken (CGK), and they established their own theological seminary in the town of Apeldoorn.

Move to Amsterdam
Amidst all these developments, Bavinck stayed put and pursued his class lectures, research, writing, and publication – making his distinctive mark as an orthodox Calvinist theologian and churchman.

The recently founded Free University in Amsterdam (VU), under the leadership of Abraham Kuyper, was meant to be a bastion of Reformed learning in all fields of thought.  The Free University including its Theology Faculty for training clergy, unlike Kampen Seminary, was independent of both the state and all church denominations. But, of course, theology was the VU's initial leading concern for some decades. So, Bavinck, when he was first invited to join the VU Faculty, had to weigh the merits of teaching what concerned him in his theological research, in such a seemingly independent environment.  With Kuyper in the same faculty, he might have come to feel quite crowded.

After refusing the invitation of Abraham Kuyper several times to come to Amsterdam, finally Bavinck accepted Kuyper's plea. In 1902 he succeeded Kuyper as Professor of Theology at the Free University in Amsterdam. Kuyper himself had developed other workloads, and simply wanted the best man available to replace himself. Thus, Bavinck moved to the big city, with his first edition of multi-volume Gereformeerde Dogmatiek already in publication. He arrived well-credentialed and well-respected. He remained at VU for the remainder of his teaching career. In 1906 he became a member of the Royal Netherlands Academy of Arts and Sciences. In 1911, he was named to the Senate of the Netherlands Parliament. He assisted in the encouragement of the Gereformeerde people to build their own Christian schools, without state financial help, until such a time as the 80-years "School War" was brought to an end by the granting of government assistance to all schools.

In 1908 he visited the United States and gave the Stone Lectures at Princeton Theological Seminary.

Bavinck died on 29 July 1921 in Amsterdam.

Bavinck and Kuyper
Inevitably he has been compared with his contemporary Abraham Kuyper. J. H. Landwehr, Bavinck's first biographer, had this to say of the two: "Bavinck was an Aristotelian, Kuyper had a Platonic spirit. Bavinck was the man of clear concept, Kuyper the man of the fecund idea.  Bavinck worked with the historically given; Kuyper proceeded speculatively by way of intuition. Bavinck's was primarily an inductive mind; Kuyper's primarily deductive."  One major difference in ideas between Bavinck and Kuyper is formulated largely in theological terms contrasting a doctrine called "Common Grace" with a doctrine called "the Antithesis". Bavinck emphasized Common Grace, while Kuyper emphasized (sometimes severely) the Antithesis. A comparison of the two positions, which came to designate two interwoven and contentious traditions in the GKiN and the neo-Calvinist Christian social movements that flowed from its membership, is presented in Jacob Klapwijk's important work of Reformational philosophy, entitled Bringing into Captivity Every Thought (English, 1986).

Theology

Bavinck's Doctrine of Revelation
Bavinck sensed the open question caused by the subjectivistic tendency of Friedrich Schleiermacher's doctrine of revelation. Deeply concerned with the problem of objectivism and subjectivism in the doctrine of revelation, he employed Schleiermacher’s doctrine of revelation in his own way and regarded the Bible as the objective standard for his theological work. Bavinck also stressed the importance of the church, which forms the Christian consciousness and experience. (Source: Byung Hoon Woo, Herman Bavinck, and Karl Barth)

Publications 
This section only includes Bavinck's writings which are available in English (alphabetical order).
The Certainty of Faith. Translated by Harry der Nederlanden. St. Catharines, Ontario, Canada: Paideia Press, 1980. (Original: 1901; English version translated from the third edition of 1918).
Christian Worldview. Translated and edited by Nathaniel Gray Sutanto, James Eglinton, and Cory C. Brock. Wheaton: Crossway, 2019. (Original: 1904; English version translated from the second edition).
Essays on Religion, Science, and Society. Translated by Harry Boonstra, Gerrit Sheeres. Edited by John Bolt. Grand Rapids: Baker Academic, 2008.
Herman Bavinck on Preaching & Preachers. Translated and edited by James P. Eglinton. Peabody: Hendrickson, 2017.
In the Beginning: Foundations of Creation Theology. Edited by John Bolt. Translated by John Vriend. Grand Rapids: Baker, 1999.
Our Reasonable Faith.  Translated by Henry Zylstra. Grand Rapids: Eerdmans, 1956. (Original: 1909)
 Updated version: The Wonderful Works of God: Instruction in the Christian Religion according to the Reformed Confession. Translated by Henry Zylstra and Nathaniel Gray Sutanto (Foreword). Glenside: Westminster Seminary Press, 2019.
Reformed Dogmatics. Edited by John Bolt. Translated by John Vriend. 4 vols. Grand Rapids: Baker, 2003-2008. (Original: Gereformeerde Dogmatiek, 1895–1901)
 Vol. 1 Prolegomena
 Vol. 2 God and Creation
 Vol. 3 Sin and Salvation
 Vol. 4 Holy Spirit, Church, and New Creation
Reformed Dogmatics: Abridged in One Volume. Edited by John Bolt. Grand Rapids: Baker Academic, 2011.
Reformed Ethics. Edited by John Bolt. 3 vols. Grand Rapids: Baker Academic, 2019-ongoing.
 Vol. 1 Created, Fallen, and Converted Humanity
 Vol. 2 The Duties of the Christian Life
 Vol. 3 
Saved By Grace: The Holy Spirit's Work in Calling and Regeneration. Translated by Nelson D. Kloosterman. Edited by J. Mark Beach. Grand Rapids: Reformation Heritage Books, 2013.
The Doctrine of God. Translated and edited by William Hendriksen. Edinburgh: Banner of Truth, 1977.
The Christian Family. Translated by Nelson D. Kloosterman. Grand Rapids: Christian's Library Press, 2012. (Original: 1908)
The Last Things: Hope for This World and the Next. Edited by John Bolt. Translated by John Vriend. Grand Rapids: Baker, 1996.
The Philosophy of Revelation: The Stone Lectures for 1908–1909, Princeton Theological Seminary. New York: Longmans, Green, and Co., 1909.
 Updated version: Philosophy of Revelation: A New Annotated Edition. Edited by Cory Brock and Nathaniel Gray Sutanto. Peabody: Hendrickson, 2018.
The Sacrifice of Praise: Meditations Before and After Receiving Access to the Table of the Lord. Translated by John Dolfin. Grand Rapids: Louis Kregel, 1922. (Original: 1901)
 Updated Version: The Sacrifice of Praise. Translated and edited by Cameron Clausing and Gregory Parker. Peabody, Hendrickson: 2019.

Articles:
 
 
 
 
 Bavinck, Herman (2017). "My Journey to America". Edited by George Harinck. Translated by James Eglinton. Dutch Crossing: Journal of Low Countries Studies. 41 (2):180–93.

See also
 John Bolt (theologian)

References

Footnotes

Works cited

Resources

Our Reasonable Faith (Chinese Translation)

External links 
A Digital Bibliography of Herman Bavinck - Bavinck's well-structured bibliography with links to his books and articles
The Bavinck Institute - Offers an up-to-date Bavinck bibliography and publishes The Bavinck Review.
 hermanbavinck.org - A full index of books, articles, lectures, news, information, discussions, and updates on the life and writings of Herman Bavinck.
Book Review : First three volumes of Reformed Dogmatics
A Cathartic Reading of Herman Bavinck
 
 
 

1854 births
1921 deaths
19th-century Calvinist and Reformed theologians
20th-century Calvinist and Reformed theologians
Anti-Revolutionary Party politicians
Calvinist and Reformed philosophers
Dutch Calvinist and Reformed theologians
Epistemologists
Ontologists
Protestant philosophers
Dutch evangelicals
Dutch members of the Dutch Reformed Church
Members of the Royal Netherlands Academy of Arts and Sciences
Members of the Senate (Netherlands)
People from Hoogeveen
philosophers of religion
Reformed Churches Christians from the Netherlands
Academic staff of Vrije Universiteit Amsterdam
Writers about religion and science
Critics of atheism
Christian apologists
Christian humanists